Nelson Faviell Henderson (24 September 1865 – 16 June 1943) was a rugby union international who represented Scotland in 1892.

Early life
Nelson Henderson was born on 24 September 1865, a son of the publisher James Henderson. He attended Dulwich College, Fettes College and Magdalen College.

Rugby union career
At Oxford University he played for the varsity fifteen and obtained his blue in 1887. In the early 1890s he played for London Scottish F.C. Henderson made his international debut on 20 February 1892 at Edinburgh in the Scotland versus Ireland match, which was won by Scotland.

Later life
Nelson Henderson became involved in his father's publishing business, James Henderson & Sons, and became its chairman after his father's retirement in 1900.  The business went into liquidation in 1920.

References

1865 births
1943 deaths
People educated at Dulwich College
People educated at Fettes College
Rugby union forwards
Scotland international rugby union players
Scottish rugby union players